Gradišče pri Ormožu is a small settlement in the Slovene Hills northwest of Ormož in northeastern Slovenia. It belongs to the Municipality of Sveti Tomaž, which became an independent municipality in 2006. The area traditionally belonged to the Styria region and is now included in the Drava Statistical Region.

Name
The name of the settlement was changed from Gradišče to Gradišče pri Ormožu in 1953.

References

External links
Gradišče pri Ormožu on Geopedia

Populated places in the Municipality of Sveti Tomaž